Rafał Piotr Buszek (born 28 April 1987) is a Polish professional volleyball player, a former member of the Poland national team. A participant in the Olympic Games Rio 2016, and the 2014 World Champion. At the professional club level, he plays for PSG Stal Nysa.

Personal life
Buszek was born in Dębica, Poland. He is married to Aleksandra. In September 2016, Buszek and his wife announced via social media they are expecting their first child. On October 18, 2016 their son was born and Rafał announced his arrival and added photo via Instagram in February 2017. In May 2018, their daughter was born.

Career

Clubs
On April 28, 2015 Buszek achieved his second title of Polish Champion with Asseco Resovia. On May 4, 2015 he signed a contract with another Polish club ZAKSA Kędzierzyn-Koźle.

National team
Buszek debuted in the Polish national team on May 29, 2014 against Brazil (0-3). He was appointed by coach Stephane Antiga on World League 2014. Initially, he was supposed to be a deputy to principal players during matches in Brazil, but after a few victories (amongst others, the winning match with Brazil on May 31, 2014) he became a favorite to play at the World Championship. On August 16, 2014 Buszek was appointed to the squad at the World Championship held in Poland. On September 21, 2014 he won the title of World Champion 2014 as part of this team. On October 27, 2014 he received a state award granted by the Polish President Bronisław Komorowski – Gold Cross of Merit for outstanding sports achievements and worldwide promotion of Poland.

Honours

Clubs
 CEV Champions League
  2014/2015 – with Asseco Resovia
 National championships
 2012/2013  Polish Championship, with Asseco Resovia
 2014/2015  Polish Championship, with Asseco Resovia
 2015/2016  Polish Championship, with ZAKSA Kędzierzyn-Koźle
 2016/2017  Polish Cup, with ZAKSA Kędzierzyn-Koźle
 2016/2017  Polish Championship, with ZAKSA Kędzierzyn-Koźle

State awards
 2014:  Gold Cross of Merit

References

External links

 
 Player profile at PlusLiga.pl 
 Player profile at Volleybox.net

Living people
1987 births
People from Dębica
Sportspeople from Podkarpackie Voivodeship
Polish men's volleyball players
Polish Champions of men's volleyball
Olympic volleyball players of Poland
Volleyball players at the 2016 Summer Olympics
Recipients of the Gold Cross of Merit (Poland)
Projekt Warsaw players
Resovia (volleyball) players
Effector Kielce players
AZS Olsztyn players
ZAKSA Kędzierzyn-Koźle players
Stal Nysa players
Outside hitters